The following lists events that happened during 2014 in Somalia.

Incumbents 
 President: Hassan Sheikh Mohamud
 Prime Minister: Abdiweli Sheikh Ahmed (until 24 December), Omar Abdirashid Ali Sharmarke (starting 24 December)

Events

January
 January 8 - A presidential election is held in Puntland.

December
 December 2 - Transparency International issues its 2014 Corruption Perceptions Index with Somalia tying with North Korea with the lowest ranking.

See also
2014 timeline of the War in Somalia

References

 
Somalia
2010s in Somalia
Years of the 21st century in Somalia
Somalia